Ucharonidge Station is a pastoral lease that operates as a cattle station in the Northern Territory of Australia.

It is operated in conjunction with Newcastle Waters and Dungowan Stations. The property shares a boundary with Beetaloo Station to the north, Mungabroom to the east, Helen Springs Station to the south and Tandyidgee to the west.

Paul and Florence Beebe drew Ucharonidge lease in a land ballot in 1948. The station was established in 1949 when the Beebe family moved onto the land. By 1951 Ucharonidge, and most of the Northern pastoral lands, were struck by a serious drought, with bushfires destroying  a killing over 2,000 head of cattle. The Beebes left the property for a year until good rains fell.

The Beebes were among the first to introduce Brahman cattle onto the Barkly tableland in the 1960s. In the mid-1960s William James (Mick) and his brother Roy bought the property from their father. Mick Beebe died in 2004 after years spent improving the herd at Ucharonidge.

In 2008 the Consolidated Pastoral Company acquired Ucharonidge from the Beebe family paying about 28 million.

See also
List of ranches and stations

References

Pastoral leases in the Northern Territory
Stations (Australian agriculture)
1949 establishments in Australia